Chen Fang is the name of:

 Chun Afong or Chen Fang (陳芳), Qing ambassador to the Kingdom of Hawaii
 Chen Fang (sport shooter) (陈放; b. 1983), Chinese sport shooter